OpenBet is a provider of sportsbook technology, content and services.

In September 2021, Endeavor Group Holdings, Inc, announced that it would acquire OpenBet for $1.2 billion in cast and stock. The acquisition was completed in September 2022.

Description
In 2020, it was the market leader in Canada where 80% of all digital sports bets were processed through its platform. In the same year in the UK, it accounted for 65%, and in Australia, 46%. The OpenBet platform is licensed in 13 US states, and last year 40% of all bets in the country were carried out on its platform. 
OpenBet develops front-end and back-office gaming products, including management and data analysis and reporting tools. 

Its platform is designed to allow users to bet and play in multiple languages and currencies across a range of products and platforms, including web, mobile, retail outlets, call centres and interactive television, with a single sign-on to a centralised OpenBet account.

History
Orbis Technology Ltd was founded on 2 February 1996 by Clive Haworth, James Caddy and Charles Malir

The company's first sports betting application was released as Betonline through a City Index and Sporting Life joint venture in time for the 1998 World Cup. In 1999 Orbis launched their OpenBet Casino at ICE and the Sky Vegas Live Roulette channel was launched. By 2000, Ladbrokes, Surrey Sports and Paddy Power were live on OpenBet.

In December 2000, the company was acquired by NDS Group, a News Corporation company and a technology provider in digital television. James Caddy stepped down as CEO in 2004 with David Loveday taking over. NT Media was acquired in September 2005 and then Electracade in December 2008.
 
In 2010, Orbis Technology was renamed to OpenBet, the name of its eponymous software betting platform. It also acquired Alphameric Solutions, a software company supplying betting retail products, which was renamed as the OpenBet Retail division.

It was in a Sunday Times survey in 2010, and achieved a one star accreditation in 2015.

In January 2011, OpenBet was sold by NDS for £208 million, in a management buyout backed by private equity firm, Vitruvian Partners. In March 2013 David Loveday stepped down, with COO Jeremy Thompson-Hill taking over as CEO of Openbet.

In April 2015, OpenBet acquired their Greek branch from outsourcing partner Athens Technology Center S.A., increasing the group's headcount by 25%.

In 2016, OpenBet was named sports betting supplier of the year at the eGamingReview B2B awards for the seventh successive year. Vitruvian Partners sold OpenBet to NYX Gaming Group in 2016.

In 2017, NYX was acquired by Scientific Games Corporation with OpenBet becoming part of the latter's SG Digital division in 2018.

In 2019, OpenBet partnered up with the TAB NZ https://igamingbusiness.com/nz-tab-completes-26m-relaunch/

References

Software companies of the United Kingdom
Online gambling companies of the United Kingdom
Companies based in the London Borough of Hounslow
2017 mergers and acquisitions
Gambling companies established in 1996
British companies established in 1996
Software companies established in 1996
2011 mergers and acquisitions
2016 mergers and acquisitions
2022 mergers and acquisitions